Black Lake is the lowest-lying lake in the Triglav Lakes Valley, part of the Julian Alps in Slovenia. It is  named for its location in a basin in the middle of the forest, which stretches right to the edge of the Komarča rock face. Because of its relatively low elevation, it is the warmest of the Triglav Lakes. The Alpine Newt, endemic to the Alps, lives in it.

References

External links

Glacial lakes of Slovenia
Triglav Lakes Valley
Municipality of Bohinj
Lakes of the Julian Alps
Wetlands of Slovenia